A penumbral lunar eclipse took place on 30 November 2020. A penumbral lunar eclipse occurs at full moon when the Moon passes through Earth's penumbral shadow.

The penumbra caused a subtle dimming on the lunar surface, which was only visible to the naked eye when 82.85% of the Moon's diameter had immersed into Earth's penumbral shadow.

Visibility 
It was visible after sunset from east Asia and Australia, and before dawn in North and South America.

Gallery

Related eclipses

Eclipses of 2020 
 A penumbral lunar eclipse on 10 January.
 A penumbral lunar eclipse on 5 June.
 An annular solar eclipse on 21 June.
 A penumbral lunar eclipse on 5 July.
 A penumbral lunar eclipse on 30 November.
 A total solar eclipse on 14 December.

Lunar year series

Saros series 

It is part of Saros cycle 116.

Half-Saros cycle
A lunar eclipse will be preceded and followed by solar eclipses by 9 years and 5.5 days (a half saros). This lunar eclipse is related to two partial solar eclipses of Solar Saros 123.

Tritos series 
 Preceded: Lunar eclipse of November 31, 2009
 Followed: Lunar eclipse of October 30, 2031

Tzolkinex 
 Preceded: Lunar eclipse of October 18, 2013
 Followed: Lunar eclipse of January 12, 2028

See also 
List of lunar eclipses and List of 21st-century lunar eclipses

References

External links 
 Saros cycle 116
 

2020-11
2020 in science
November 2020 events